São Francisco Xavier (English: Saint Francis Xavier) is a former civil parish (freguesia) in the city and municipality of Lisbon, Portugal. It was created on February 7, 1959. At the administrative reorganization of Lisbon on 8 December 2012 it merged with the former parish of Santa Maria de Belém, thus creating the new Belém parish.

Main sites
Santana Windmills
São Jerónimo Chapel

References 

Former parishes of Lisbon
Belém (Lisbon)